The titles Hovsångare (literally "Court Singer") for men and  Hovsångerska for women are awarded by the Swedish monarch to a singer (usually an opera singer) who, by their vocal art, has contributed to the international standing of Swedish singing. The formal title was introduced by King Gustav III of Sweden in 1773, with the first recipients being Elisabeth Olin and Carl Stenborg. The position as such, however, dates back to the 17th century, when Anne Chabanceau de La Barre and Joseph Chabanceau de La Barre were singers at the court of Queen Christina of Sweden.

Named

21st century 
 2021: Ann Hallenberg, John Lundgren
 2018: Malin Byström, Katarina Karnéus, Daniel Johansson. 
 2013: Elin Rombo, Michael Weinius
 2010: Anna Larsson, Malena Ernman, Miah Persson
 2006: Nina Stemme, Hillevi Martinpelto
 2004: Karl-Magnus Fredriksson, Peter Mattei
 2003: Loa Falkman
 2002: Helena Döse
 2000: Katarina Dalayman, Ingrid Tobiasson

20th century 
 1999: Lena Nordin
 1995: Anne Sofie von Otter, Birgitta Svendén
 1994: Siv Wennberg
 1992: Jerker Arvidson, Anita Soldh
 1990: MariAnne Häggander, Björn Asker
 1988: Britt Marie Aruhn, Elisabeth Erikson, Gösta Winbergh
 1985: Håkan Hagegård, Laila Andersson-Palme
 1983: Sylvia Lindenstrand, Bengt Rundgren
 1978: Arne Tyrén
 1976: Ragnar Ulfung, Edith Thallaug, Berit Lindholm
 1973: Ingvar Wixell, Birgit Nordin-Arvidson, Carl-Axel Hallgren
 1972: Alice Babs Sjöblom,
 1968: Barbro Ericson-Hederén
 1966: Margareta Hallin, Erik Saedén
 1965: Nicolai Gedda
 1963: Kerstin Meyer-Bexelius
 1959: Elisabeth Söderström-Olow
 1955: Birgit Nilsson
 1952: Leon Björker
 1946: Set Svanholm, Sigurd Björling
 1944: Jussi Björling, Kerstin Thorborg
 1943: Hjördis Schymberg, Joel Berglund
 1942: Irma Björck, Einar Beyron
 1941: Helga Görlin
 1940: Brita Hertzberg-Beyron
 1936: Karin Maria Branzell-Reinshagen, Gertrud Pålson-Wettergren
 1933: Martin Öhman
 1929: Åke Wallgren, David Stockman
 1928: Marianne Mörner
 1925: Nanny Larsén-Todsen
 1923: Julia Claussen
 1911: Sigrid Arnoldson-Fischof
 1909: Signe Rappe-Weldén, John Forsell
 1906: Arvid Ödmann

19th century 
 1886: Mathilda Grabow
 1854: Louise Michaëli
 1847: Jenny Lind
 1837: Mathilda Gelhaar
 1837: Anna Sofia Sevelin
 1837: Henriette Widerberg
 1834: Mathilda Berwald
 1831: Isak Albert Berg
 1815: Jeanette Wässelius

18th century 

 1788: Franziska Stading
 1787: Kristofer Kristian Karsten
 1773: Lovisa Augusti
 1773: Carl Stenborg
 1773: Elisabeth Olin

See also 
 Sophia Schröder
 Kungliga Hovkapellet
 Litteris et Artibus
Kammersänger

References 

 Nyström, Pia; Kyhlberg-Boström, Anna; Elmquist Anne-Marie: Kungl. Musikaliska akademien: matrikel 1771-1995, Kungliga Musikaliska Akademien, Stockholm 1996, Kungl. Musikaliska akademiens skriftserie, 84. ISSN 0347-5158. . Libris 7749167.
 Moberg, Carl-Allan; Sundström, Einar; Morin, Gösta: Sohlmans musiklexikon: nordiskt och allmänt uppslagsverk för tonkonst, musikliv och dans. 2, Ehlers-Ingressa, Sohlman, Stockholm 1950 (swe). Libris 42147.
 Åström, Kenneth; Engström, Christer; Marklund, Kari: Nationalencyklopedin: ett uppslagsverk på vetenskaplig grund utarbetat på initiativ av Statens kulturråd. Bd 9, [Him-Issk], Bra böcker, Höganäs 1992 (swe). Libris 8211193.
 Leif Jonsson; Ann-Marie Nilsson & Greger Andersson: Musiken i Sverige. Från forntiden till stormaktstidens slut 1720 (Music in Sweden. From Ancient times to the end of Empire) (Swedish)

Swedish titles
1773 in Sweden
Swedish music